Dmitri Maneacov (born 6 March 1992) is a Moldovan footballer who plays as a forward for Lichtenauer FV.

Career
Maneacov has played in the Moldovan National Division for Olimpia Bălți, Ungheni and Florești.

References

External links

1992 births
Living people
Moldovan footballers
Sportspeople from Bălți
Association football forwards
CSF Bălți players
FC Ungheni players
FC Florești players
Moldovan Super Liga players